Apurimac is an album by the German Andean new age band Cusco. Though their sound has certainly matured over the years, this was the breakout album by the band, garnering their first major international success with its release on the Higher Octave music label.

The album was originally written in 1984 and released to select markets in 1985, but it was not until 1988 that the project was finally released worldwide via the new signing with Higher Octave. This album would become the first album in a trilogy, with the second and third installments being released in 1994 and 1997. Despite the name of the band implying an ancient South American sound, this was the first album that focused specifically on bringing together native Incan instrumentation with traditional European rock music structures (synthesized pan flute sounds, which previously were used only sporadically, are brought to the forefront here).

Inca Dance is used as the closing theme of the radio show Coast to Coast AM, and other tracks have been used as bumper music for the same show. Several songs from the album, including Inca Dance and Flute Battle, have been used as background music at the Epcot theme park at Walt Disney World Resort.  In addition, Tupac Amaru still receives radio play in certain markets today.

Track listing
 "Apurimac" (Michael Holm/Majo Rolyat) – 3:43
 "Flute Battle" (Holm/Kristian Schultze) – 2:35
 "Tupac Amaru" (Schultze) – 3:03
 "Flying Condor" (Schultze) – 5:02
 "Inca Dance" (Schultze) – 2:43
 "Pastorale" (Holm/Schultze) – 2:22
 "Amazonas" (Holm) – 3:47
 "Inca Bridges" (Holm/Wolff-Ekkehard Stein/Wolfgang Jass) – 3:21
 "Andes" (Schultze) – 3:51
 "Atahualpa - The Last Inca" (Schultze/Michael Ruff) – 3:51
 "Fighting Inca" (Schultze) – 3:22
 "Apurimac II" (Holm/Rolyat) – 1:29

Album credits 

  Kristian Schultze – Keyboards
  Michael Holm – Keyboards, producer, photography
  Todd Canedy – drums  
  Hansi Strohr – Bass
  Billy Lang - Guitar
  Johannes Walter – Photography   
  Dee Westlund – Art direction  
  Murry Whiteman – Design  
  Tom Baker – Mastering 
  Jochen Scheffter – Engineer 
  Cusco – Performer

References 

1985 albums
Cusco (band) albums